John David Alexander, known as J. D. Alexander or JD Alexander (born July 16, 1959 in Camp Lejeune, North Carolina) is a businessman and former Florida Republican politician from Lake Wales. From 2002-2012, he served in the Florida Senate, representing almost 500,000 residents of the 17th district, which included all of Hardee and Highlands and parts of DeSoto, Glades, Okeechobee, Polk, and St. Lucie counties. Previously, he was a member of the Florida House of Representatives from 1998 to 2002. Alexander has also been the CEO of Atlantic Blue Group and Alico.

Personal life
JD Alexander moved with his family to Florida in 1961 from Camp Lejeune, North Carolina. He is the grandson of Ben Hill Griffin Jr., a Florida cracker and a former Florida State Senator and Florida State Representative. Alexander's great-grandfather, Napoleon B. Broward, served as the Governor of Florida from 1905 to 1909.

Political career

Florida House of Representatives
JD Alexander served in the Florida House of Representatives from 1998 to 2002.

Florida Senate
Alexander was elected to the Florida Senate in November 2002 and was subsequently reelected in 2004 and 2008. Senator Alexander served as Majority Whip for the 2004-2006 term.

Senator Alexander served as the Chair of the Budget Committee and the Joint Legislative Budget Commission.  In addition, he served as the Vice-Chair of the Rules Committee and a member on the Agriculture, Banking and Insurance, Budget Subcommittee on Finance and Tax, Budget Subcommittee on Transportation, Tourism, and Economic Development Appropriations, Education Pre-K – 12, and Rules Subcommittee on Ethics and Elections. Due to term limits, he will leave the senate at the end of the 2012 session, but he is intent on funding two projects in his district. The first is the $34.5 million Heartland Parkway, a proposed toll road that has been delayed for years because there is not enough existing traffic to justify it, and it will cross sensitive environmental land. Alexander's company owns a ranch along the path of the proposed roadway which could benefit from its construction. Other development near the highway would support building the expressway, and Alexander is promoting one such project.

One of Alexander's major initiatives was the establishment of Florida Polytechnic University in Lakeland. Alexander promoted splitting the institution, originally a branch campus of the University of South Florida known as USF Polytechnic, into a separate school in the State University System of Florida. This was controversial in some quarters, as it came during a very tight budget year, and thus the Florida Board of Governors favored a more measured approach. Alexander advanced a state budget for 2012-2013 that provided $33 million for USF Polytechnic to become an independent institution. The budget included a large cut for the State University System, almost 25% of which came from USF, comprising 58% of its budget. For his part, Alexander sees the establishment of the university as his legacy.

Business
Alexander was the CEO of Atlantic Blue Group, Inc.—which owns a large amount of rural property in Central Florida—and Alico, Inc.

Affiliations
 Polk Farm Bureau Board of Director,  President 
 Polk Business for World Class Schools, Board of Directors, past Vice Chair 
 Vanguard School Board of Trustees 
 Florida Citrus Research Advisory Council, past Member & past Chair
 Florida Citrus Production Managers Association, past Board of Directors & past President
 Florida Citrus Research and Education Foundation, Past Board of Directors

Education
Alexander graduated from the University of Florida in 1981 with a B.S. in Agriculture.

Family
Alexander is married to the former Cindy Monroe, and they are the parents of two daughters, Keaton and Britton

References 

1959 births
Citrus farmers from Florida
Republican Party Florida state senators
Living people
Republican Party members of the Florida House of Representatives
University of Florida College of Agricultural and Life Sciences alumni
People from Camp Lejeune, North Carolina
20th-century American politicians
21st-century American politicians